Earlswood (Welsh: Coed-yr-iarll) is a rural area of scattered settlement in Monmouthshire, south east Wales, United Kingdom.  It is located five miles northwest of Chepstow, within the parish of Shirenewton and immediately east of the forested area of Wentwood.

History

Before the Norman invasion of Wales, the area was largely forested.  At the time of the Domesday Book it formed part of the estates of Durand, the Sheriff of Gloucester. He and his successors began the process of woodland clearance, and established the village of "Sheriff's Newton", now Shirenewton.  Later, in the 12th century, the post of Sheriff was held by  Milo Fitzwalter (Miles de Gloucester), who became Earl of Hereford and Lord High Constable of England, and the hilly area north west of Shirenewton became known as the Earl's Wood.

The small Earlswood Methodist Chapel was established in 1754, and is one of the earliest purpose-built chapels to survive in Monmouthshire. The chapel, claimed to be the oldest Methodist chapel in Wales, was founded largely due to the efforts of Ann Lewis, born in Earlswood in 1747. Inspired by John Wesley who preached at Devauden Green, Lewis founded a branch of the Methodist Missionary Society and travelled widely on foot to raise funds, including many visits to Bristol via the ferry from Black Rock at Portskewett.

The chapel was built largely by local labour and tradition maintains that much of the stone was carried from the nearby quarry, by the local women, in their aprons. The Chapel opened in 1791. The small kitchen at the side of the chapel was originally a stable for the preacher's horse.

The chapel was extended in 1908.

A school was built in the area in 1861 for a maximum of 80 students.
It has since been closed down.

The village today
Today the village has a large community building built with publicly donated money, as a memorial to members of the parish who were killed in World War II. The building hosts many events for the parish.

References

External links

 Map of the locality
 Geograph: photos of the Earlswood area

Villages in Monmouthshire